Digitivalva wolfschlaegeri is a moth of the family Acrolepiidae. It is found in the Republic of Macedonia, Croatia and Turkey.

References

Acrolepiidae
Moths described in 1956
Insects of Turkey